45 Days: The Fight for a Nation is a documentary film depicting the Nagorno-Karabakh war released in 2021. The film is shot and narrated by Emile Ghessen and produced by Asko Akopyan.

Synopsis 
The film was made during the second Nagorno-Karabakh war in fall 2020, when Azerbaijan launched a large-scale military offensive against Artsakh (Nagorno-Karabakh).

"Recognising the significant amount of disinformation emerging from the war and lack of world news coverage, Emile travelled the region and embedded himself with local people – those who took up arms to fight. This is their story," the film's description says.

The movie shows how the news media used misinformation or avoided coverage of these events and thereby affected the public's awareness and perception of this invasion and war.

Background and production 
British Filmmaker Emile Ghessen who served in Royal Marines Commando for 12 years in Iraq and Afghanistan, had only made two other independent documentary movies before. 45 Days: The Fight for a Nation is his third documentary which he shot after attending film school.

The film has been submitted to the Oscars for consideration in the documentary category.

In August 2021, the film was first screened in Yerevan, Armenia. In September 2021, a screening was held at the Chinese Theater, in Hollywood, CA.

References 

Documentary films about war
2021 documentary films
2021 films
Armenian documentary films
2020s English-language films